Inocente is a 2012 short documentary film directed by Sean Fine and Andrea Nix. The film received the 2013 Academy Award for Best Documentary (Short Subject). The film is an inspiring coming-of-age story of a 15-year-old girl in California. Though homeless and undocumented, she refuses to give up on her dream of being an artist, proving that the hand she has been dealt does not define her – her dreams do.

The film was partially financed by the crowdfunding website Kickstarter and was the first crowdfunded film to win an Oscar.

After being nominated for an Academy Award, the film was released along with all the other 15 Oscar-nominated short films in theaters by ShortsHD. The film is also available for communities and schools along with companion arts workshops developed by Shine Global and partners.

References

External links

Inocente at The Cinema Guild

2012 films
2012 short documentary films
Best Documentary Short Subject Academy Award winners
Kickstarter-funded documentaries
American short documentary films
Films directed by Sean Fine and Andrea Nix
2010s American films